The Sebeș is a left tributary of the river Olt in Romania. It discharges into the Olt east of Făgăraș. Its source is in the Făgăraș Mountains.

Tributaries

The following rivers are tributaries to the river Sebeș:

Left: Țiganu, Cuciulata
Right: Buzduganu, Valea Laptelui, Groapele, Valea Neamțului, Pârâul Hotarului, Pârâul lui Simion, Coșarnița, Fântânele, Corbu

References

Rivers of Romania
Rivers of Brașov County